Battle of Britain is a turn-based strategy video game developed and published by Personal Software Services for the Commodore 64 in 1987. It was also ported to the Amstrad CPC and ZX Spectrum later that year. It is the seventh instalment to the Strategic Wargames series. The game is set during the Battle of Britain campaign of the Second World War and revolves around Britain's defence and prevention against a Nazi invasion. In the game, the player commands the Royal Air Force as they must defend key cities against the Luftwaffe.

The game contains elements of first-person shooting; during some sequences the game requires a certain number of aircraft to be shot down. Battle of Britain received mixed to positive reviews from critics upon release. Critics praised the fast pace of the gameplay and features, however, one reviewer was divided over the historical accuracy of the battle.

Gameplay

The game is a turn-based strategy and focuses on air battles during the Battle of Britain campaign of the Second World War. The player commands squadrons of the Royal Air Force and the main objective of the game is to defend key cities and radar installations from the Luftwaffe. Unlike previous games in the series, Battle of Britain is the first to include cursor movement, a scrolling interface and elements of first-person shooter gameplay. At the start of the game, the player is given the option of how many RAF squadrons they wish to allocate for offensive and defensive purposes; a proportionate amount must be sent to attack Luftwaffe squadrons whilst the others will be left to defend key cities from air raids.

The game has three individual scenarios; training mode, Blitzkrieg mode, and campaign mode. Training mode is set on the lowest difficulty and allows the player to finish the game by using any strategy over an indefinite period of time. Blitzkrieg mode only lasts one in-game day and features the Luftwaffe going out for an "all-out" attack simultaneously on every target and city. The campaign mode takes place over a period of 30 days and is set on the highest difficulty. In addition, the campaign mode features historically accurate movements and strategies used by both the RAF and Luftwaffe.

At the start of the game, a wave of Luftwaffe aircraft (in the appearance of Balkenkreuz sprites on the map) will cross the English Channel and proceed to bomb various cities, air bases and radar installations. In response, RAF squadrons are automatically scrambled and will await orders to either engage invading Luftwaffe fighters or to defend key cities from bombers. When a RAF squadron has successfully engaged a Luftwaffe unit on the map, the game will shift to a first-person shooter perspective, in which the point of view is portrayed from a cockpit of either a Spitfire or Messerschmitt Bf 109, depending on the side chosen. During the dogfight sequence, the number of Luftwaffe casualties will depend on how many aircraft the player was able to shoot down.

The game features a changing weather system, which will vary from every hour and will provide obstructions for various forces and installations. For example, fog will close runways whereas storms will temporarily disrupt bombing runs and dogfights. Over time, RAF squadrons will run out of ammunition or fuel, and thus must replenish at the nearest RAF station, which will render them vulnerable to a Luftwaffe bombing run. In between turns, the player has the opportunity to request reinforcements from RAF reserves, however the longer the campaign progresses, the quality of the reserves will diminish.

Background
Personal Software Services was founded in Coventry, England, by Gary Mays and Richard Cockayne in 1981. The company were known for creating games that revolved around historic war battles and conflicts, such as Theatre Europe, Bismark and Falklands '82. The company had a partnership with French video game developer ERE Informatique, and published localised versions of their products to the United Kingdom. In 1986, Cockayne took a decision to alter their products for release on 16-bit consoles, as he found that smaller 8-bit consoles such as the ZX Spectrum lacked the processing power for larger strategy games. The decision was falsely interpreted as "pull-out" from the Spectrum market by a video game journalist. Following years of successful sales throughout the mid 1980s, Personal Software Services experienced financial difficulties, in what Cockayne admitted in a retrospective interview that "he took his eye off the ball". The company was acquired by Mirrorsoft in February 1987, and was later dispossessed by the company due to strains of debt.

Reception

The game received mixed to positive reviews from critics upon release. Gwyn Hughes of Your Sinclair praised the game's fast pace and tempo of gameplay, stating it to be "fast and furious". However, he criticised the arcade-style flying sequences, referring them as "dodgy" due to the system's lack of processing power. Philippa Irvine of Crash praised the "all-action" theme of the game, and heralded the campaign as "impressive" in both terms of content and length. Gary Rook of Sinclair User similarly praised the gameplay, suggesting that it had a "workmanship" quality to it, however he noted that it lacked a "certain sparkle". Gordon Hamlett of ZX Computing found some aspects of the gameplay confusing, comparing it to juggling.

A reviewer of Computer and Video Games stated that the game "isn't very good", nor the best Battle of Britain recreation on the market, and criticised on how interceptions were "far too easy" to make. Reviewing the ZX Spectrum version of the game, a critic from Advanced Computer Entertainment cited the game as historically inaccurate due to it lasting only 30 days, whereas the actual Battle of Britain was considerably longer. However, they praised the gameplay as an "enjoyable challenge" and a good value for money.

References

External links
Battle of Britain at MobyGames

1987 video games
Amstrad CPC games
Commodore 64 games
Single-player video games
Turn-based strategy video games
Video games developed in the United Kingdom
Britain (video game)
ZX Spectrum games
Britain (video game)
Video games set in 1940